Bruno Caldini Perone (born 6 July 1987), or simply Bruno Perone, is a Brazilian footballer who plays as a central defender for AE Prat.

Career
Perone played eight Campeonato Brasileiro Série A games for Figueirense, having scored one goal.

On 11 August 2011, Perone joined Queens Park Rangers on a one-year deal. He made his debut for QPR on 23 August 2011 in a League Cup loss against Rochdale. Four days later, he made his Premier League debut playing the entire match against Wigan Athletic.

On 6 June 2012, it was announced that Perone has left Queens Park Rangers.

25 October 2012, Nottingham Forest manager Sean O'Driscoll announced a "mystery signing". News broke on social networking site Twitter that Perone was on trial with Nottingham Forest; however, nothing came of this trial period. In January 2013, he signed for Linense.

On 17 August 2015, he signed for Indian Super League franchise Kerala Blasters FC. The following 23 February, he joined United Soccer League side Wilmington Hammerheads.

On 7 January 2017, free agent Perone agreed to a six-month contract with Segunda División side Gimnàstic de Tarragona, after impressing on a trial basis. On 31 January of the following year, he signed a two-and-a-half-year contract with fellow league team Real Zaragoza, after cutting ties with Nàstic.

On 24 January 2019, Perone was loaned to Extremadura UD, still in the Spanish second division. After narrowly avoiding relegation, he signed a permanent two-year contract with the club due to an obligatory clause in the previous loan deal, but returned to Nàstic on loan on 8 August.

On 17 January 2020, Perone moved to fellow third division side Hércules CF on loan for the remainder of the campaign.

References

External links

1987 births
Living people
Brazilian people of Italian descent
Footballers from São Paulo
Brazilian footballers
Association football defenders
Campeonato Brasileiro Série A players
Campeonato Brasileiro Série B players
Esporte Clube Noroeste players
J. Malucelli Futebol players
Figueirense FC players
Tombense Futebol Clube players
Mirassol Futebol Clube players
Clube Atlético Linense players
Associação Desportiva Recreativa e Cultural Icasa players
ABC Futebol Clube players
Grêmio Novorizontino players
Segunda División players
Segunda División B players
Tercera División players
Xerez CD footballers
Gimnàstic de Tarragona footballers
Real Zaragoza players
Extremadura UD footballers
Hércules CF players
UA Horta players
AE Prat players
Premier League players
Queens Park Rangers F.C. players
Indian Super League players
Kerala Blasters FC players
USL Championship players
Wilmington Hammerheads FC players
Brazilian expatriate footballers
Brazilian expatriate sportspeople in England
Brazilian expatriate sportspeople in Spain
Brazilian expatriate sportspeople in India
Brazilian expatriate sportspeople in the United States
Expatriate footballers in England
Expatriate footballers in Spain
Expatriate footballers in India
Expatriate soccer players in the United States